Paralejurus is a genus of trilobite from the Late Silurian to the Middle Devonian of Africa and Europe.

Features 
These animals, up to nine centimeters long, had an oval outline and a strongly arched exoskeleton. The cephalon has a smooth, detail-poor surface and an almost inconspicuous occipital bone behind the glabella in the transition to the thorax. The facet eyes have crescent-shaped lids. The thorax consists of ten narrow segments and a clearly arched and broad axial lobe ( rhachis ). The pygidium is very broad and denominate. The axillary lobe ends roundly and upwards. From this elevation, twelve to fourteen fine furrows extend radially. In contrast to the genus Scutellum with a pygidium with distinct furrows, in Paralejurus the pygidium was very smooth and strongly fused.

Sources
 Fossils (Smithsonian Handbooks) by David Ward (Page 65)
 Leonaspis in the Paleobiology Database

Devonian trilobites of Africa
Styginidae
Corynexochida genera
Silurian trilobites
Devonian trilobites
Trilobites of Africa
Trilobites of Europe
Silurian first appearances
Middle Devonian genus extinctions